Oreonectes donglanensis is a species of cyprinid of the genus Oreonectes. It inhabits Guangxi, China and was first described by Wu in 2013. It has not been classified on the IUCN Red List and is considered harmless to humans.

References

Cyprinid fish of Asia
Freshwater fish of China
Fish described in 2013